Marcedes Alexis Lewis (born May 19, 1984) is an American football tight end who is a free agent. He played college football at UCLA, earning consensus All-American honors. He was selected by the Jacksonville Jaguars in the first round of the 2006 NFL Draft.

Early years
Lewis was born in Los Alamitos, California. He graduated from Long Beach Polytechnic High School in Long Beach, California, where he played high school football for the Long Beach Poly Jackrabbits. In 2001, he competed in a nationally televised game against De La Salle of Concord, California. As a senior, Lewis was named as a Parade magazine high school All-American and was considered a top prospect by all major recruiting services.

College career
Lewis attended UCLA, and played for the UCLA Bruins football team from 2002 to 2005. In 49 games with the Bruins, he started 32 times. He ranks ninth on the school's overall career-record receiving list and first among tight ends with 126 receptions, holding the UCLA tight end all-time records with 1,571 yards receiving and 21 touchdowns. As a senior in 2005, Lewis was a first-team All-Pacific-10 selection, a consensus first-team All-American, and won the John Mackey Award, given annually to the top tight end in college football.

Lewis was inducted into the UCLA Athletics Hall of Fame as a member of the 2022 class.

College statistics

Professional career

Jacksonville Jaguars
Lewis was selected by the Jacksonville Jaguars with the 28th overall pick in the first round of the 2006 NFL Draft. He played college football with running back Maurice Jones-Drew at UCLA who was also selected on the first day by the Jaguars. In July 2006, Lewis signed a five-year, $7.5 million contract that included $4.9 million guaranteed.

Lewis made his NFL debut in Week 1 of the 2006 season against the Pittsburgh Steelers in a 9–0 victory. He scored his first professional touchdown on a one-yard reception from David Garrard in Week 12 against the Buffalo Bills. He finished his rookie season with three starts in 15 appearances. He totaled 13 receptions for 126 receiving yards and one receiving touchdown. His role expanded in the 2007 season with 37 receptions for 391 receiving yards and two receiving touchdowns. He started all 16 games in his second year. In 2008, Lewis started all 16 games once again and recorded 41 receptions for 489 receiving yards and two receiving touchdowns, which came in consecutive games in Week 5 and Week 6. In the 2009 season, he started all 16 games and recorded 32 receptions for 518 receiving yards and two receiving touchdowns.

In the 2010 season, Lewis matched the Jaguars single-season touchdown receptions record with a total of 10 and was selected to his first Pro Bowl. He had previously been named as an alternate for the 2009 Pro Bowl. He started all 16 games and had three games with multiple receiving touchdowns.

Due in part to the 2011 NFL lockout, the Jaguars placed the franchise tag on Lewis on February 24, 2011. On August 5, 2011, after a short training camp hold out, Lewis signed a five-year contract reportedly worth about $35 million ($17 million guaranteed). In the 2011 season, he started in and appeared in 15 games and totaled 39 receptions for 460 receiving yards. For the first time in his professional career, he did not have a touchdown. In the final game of the 2012 regular season against the Tennessee Titans, Lewis had seven receptions for 103 receiving yards for his first game going over the 100-yard mark. He totaled 52 receptions for 540 receiving yards and four receiving touchdowns on the season. In the 2013 season, he totaled 25 receptions for 359 receiving yards and four receiving touchdowns in 11 games. The four receiving touchdowns all came in four consecutive games from Week 13 to Week 16. In the 2014 season, he totaled 18 receptions for 206 receiving yards and two receiving touchdowns. Lewis continued his constant production in the 2015 season with 16 receptions for 226 receiving yards in 16 games, all starts.

On March 9, 2016, Lewis re-signed a three-year, $12 million contract to remain with the Jaguars. He was placed on injured reserve on November 21, 2016, after suffering a calf injury in Week 11 against the Detroit Lions. He totaled 20 receptions for 169 receiving yards and one receiving touchdown in ten starting appearances. In Week 3 of the 2017 season, he recorded four receptions for 62 receiving yards and a career-high three receiving touchdowns in a 44–7 victory over the Baltimore Ravens. He finished with 24 receptions for 318 receiving yards and five receiving touchdowns in 16 starts. In the AFC Championship loss to the New England Patriots, Lewis recorded his first postseason touchdown on a four-yard reception from Blake Bortles.

On March 20, 2018, Lewis was released by the Jaguars after 12 seasons with the team.

Green Bay Packers

On May 24, 2018, the Green Bay Packers signed Lewis to a one-year, $2.1 million contract that included a $500,000 signing bonus. Lewis caught his first pass as a Packer on November 4, 2018, during a Week 9 loss to the New England Patriots. He finished the 2018 season with three catches for 39 yards.

On March 18, 2019, Lewis re-signed with the Packers on a one-year, $2.1 million dollar contract. Lewis caught his first touchdown as a Packer, a one-yard reception from Aaron Rodgers, on December 1, 2019, during a Week 13 victory over the New York Giants. He finished the 2019 season with 15 receptions for 156 receiving yards and one receiving touchdown. The Packers advanced to the playoffs as the NFC's 2 seed, losing in the NFC Championship to the San Francisco 49ers.

On March 24, 2020, Lewis re-signed with the Packers on a one-year contract. Lewis started 15 games, catching ten passes for 107 yards and three touchdowns. The Packers advanced to the playoffs as the top seed in the NFC, but again lost in the NFC Championship to the eventual Super Bowl champion Tampa Bay Buccaneers.

On March 30, 2021, Packers re-signed Lewis to a two-year, $8 million contract. In a Week 15, 31–30 victory against the Baltimore Ravens, Lewis surpassed 5,000 career receiving yards. He started all 17 games in the 2021 season and finished with 23 receptions for 214 receiving yards. The Packers again clinched home-field advantage as the NFC's top seed for the 2021 playoffs. However, they lost to the San Francsico 49ers in the Divisional Round.

Personal life
Lewis has been active in his hometown of Long Beach, California, holding football camps that combine sports development with academics.

NFL career statistics

Regular season

Postseason

Awards
 2005 John Mackey Award (Best TE)
 2005 All-American Team
 2005 All-Pac-10 Team
 2004 John Mackey Award Finalist (Best TE)
 2004 All-American Team
 2004 All-Pac-10 Team
 Prep Star Dream Team (Best Prep TE)
 Super Prep All-American
 Super Prep Elite (rated #4)
 Parade All-American
 Student Sports Hot 100 List (#30)
 2011 Pro Bowl

References

External links

Green Bay Packers bio
UCLA Bruins bio

1984 births
Living people
All-American college football players
American Conference Pro Bowl players
American football tight ends
Green Bay Packers players
Jacksonville Jaguars players
People from Los Alamitos, California
Players of American football from California
Sportspeople from Orange County, California
UCLA Bruins football players
Long Beach Polytechnic High School alumni